William Joseph Hafey (March 19, 1888 – May 12, 1954) was an American prelate of the Roman Catholic Church who served as bishop of the Diocese of Raleigh in North Carolina (1925–1937) and bishop of the Diocese of Scranton in Pennsylvania (1938–1954).

Biography

Early life 
William Hafey was born on March 19, 1888, in Chicopee, Massachusetts, to James and Catherine (née Mulcahy) Hafey. He attended Holy Cross College in Worcester, Massachusetts, where he obtained a Bachelor of Arts degree in 1909. From 1909 to 1910, he studied at Georgetown University Law Center in Washington, D.C., then attended Mount St. Mary's Seminary in Emmitsburg, Maryland.

Hafey was ordained to the priesthood by Bishop Owen Corrigan for the Archdiocese of Baltimore on June 16, 1914. He served as a curate at St. Joseph's Parish in Baltimore until 1920, when he became chancellor of the archdiocese.

Bishop of Raleigh
On April 6, 1925, Hafey was appointed the first bishop of the Diocese of Raleigh by Pope Pius XI. He received his episcopal consecration on June 24, 1925, from Archbishop Michael Curley at the Baltimore Cathedral. Bishops Thomas O'Leary and Michael Keyes were co-consecrators.

Coadjutor Bishop and Bishop of Scranton
Hafey was named coadjutor bishop of the Diocese of Scranton and titular bishop of Appia on October 2, 1937 by Pius IX. Haley automatically succeeded Bishop Thomas O'Reilly as the fourth bishop of Scranton on March 25, 1938. Hafey created new parishes, multiplied the number of buildings, and increased the number of priests and religious. He was also dedicated to social needs such as education, healthcare, and youth activities.

Death and legacy 
William Hafey died in Scranton, Pennsylvania, on May 12, 1954, at age 66. Bishop Hafey High School in Hazelton, Pennsylvania, was named in his memory. In 1958, the newly established Knights of Columbus Bishop Hafey Council 4507 of High Point, North Carolina was named in memory of Hafey.

See also

 Catholic Church hierarchy
 Catholic Church in the United States
 Historical list of the Catholic bishops of the United States
 List of Catholic bishops of the United States
 Lists of patriarchs, archbishops, and bishops

References

External links
Roman Catholic Diocese of Raleigh
Roman Catholic Diocese of Scranton

1888 births
1954 deaths
Roman Catholic Diocese of Raleigh
College of the Holy Cross alumni
Georgetown University Law Center alumni
Mount St. Mary's University alumni
People from Chicopee, Massachusetts
University of Scranton trustees
Roman Catholic bishops in North Carolina
Catholics from Massachusetts
20th-century Roman Catholic bishops in the United States
20th-century American academics